Cwmbrân Town Football Club is a Welsh football team based in Cwmbran, South Wales, that competes in the Gwent County League Premier Division, the fourth tier of the Welsh football league system.

The Crows were formed in 1951 when Whiteheads AFC disbanded. After playing in junior leagues the club switched to the Welsh League in 1960, moving to Cwmbran Stadium in 1975.

In 1978 Cwmbrân Town finished bottom of the Welsh League Premier Division and were relegated, in 1981 the Crows finished 16th but in 1982 won promotion to the Premier Division. In 1986 Cwmbrân Town became full members of the FAW and were chosen as one of 14 Welsh clubs to participate in both the English FA Cup and FA Trophy.

History

Formed in 1951, Cwmbrân Town began in the Monmouthshire Senior League, playing their matches at Cwmbrân Park. In 1960 the club joined the Welsh Football League and they moved to their present home at the Cwmbran Stadium in 1975. Cwmbrân lost their place in the top division of the Welsh Football League in 1978 and it took them three years to return to the top level. Although they finished eighth in the 1981–82 season, they were invited to join the National Division of the restructured League. Cwmbrân finished third in 1986–87 and almost won the title in 1989–90. In 1992 they were invited to become founder members of the League of Wales. They took the title by five points from rivals and near-neighbours Inter Cardiff, conceding only 22 goals all season and losing only three games (all 1–0).

That inaugural championship brought European reward in the form of a UEFA Champions League tie against Cork City from the Republic of Ireland. In the preliminary round, Cwmbrân won the home leg 3–2, after being 3–0 in front but despite going a goal ahead early in the second match they lost 2–1 and went out on away goals. Cwmbrân had another taste of European football in 1997 in the European Cup Winners Cup, having lost 2–1 to newly crowned champions Barry Town in the Welsh Cup final.

Qualifying for Europe again in 1998 and 1999, Cwmbrân met FC Național București of Romania, and Celtic respectively.

In the 1999–2000 Welsh Cup final Cwmbrân lost to Bangor City, and in 2002–03 Barry Town defeated them in the final in a penalty shoot-out. In the 2003–04 UEFA Cup they lost 6–0 on aggregate to Maccabi Haifa of Israel, playing the away leg in İzmir, Turkey.

Financial Problems (2006–2007) 

The 2003–04 season saw the introduction of a new manager, Brian Coyne, who had previously managed Newtown. But his reign was short, and during the 2004–05 season after the resignation of long term chairman John Colley, Brian also decided to step down as manager due to financial reasons.
 
For the rest of that season Cwmbrân were managed by former player Sean Wharton. For the next two seasons, in difficult circumstances Wharton looked to local talent to try to avoid relegation. At the end of the 2005–06 season, Town were close to dropping out of the Welsh top flight for the first time since the League's formation. Cwmbrân finished in the second relegation position, but were saved from relegation due to a lack of teams in the feeder leagues wishing to be promoted. But at the end of the 2006–07 season Cwmbrân were relegated for the first time from the Welsh Premier League into the Welsh Football League. They finished in 17th place and were ultimately relegated following a 5–1 defeat by Llanelli AFC on 20 April.

The season's on-field performances were overshadowed by off-field financial problems. Towards the end of November 2006, reports surfaced that players were not being paid. The club initially denied this, but on 30 November the club announced officially that it was unable to pay its players. A few key players left, including top scorer Jody Jenkins, who joined Haverfordwest County.

Cwmbrân Town received some help from Newport County, who offered a friendly with all proceeds going to the club. Wharton resigned at the end of the season.

Post Welsh Premier League Relegation & Welsh League Football (2007–2011) 

Season 2007–08 saw the club install a new manager, Guillermo Ganet; but his reign was short: he only stayed with the club for one season and then left by mutual consent. A year later the experienced Gary Proctor became as manager, but relegation from Welsh Football League Division 1 followed.
 
For the 2009–10 season the club had a new management team of Barrie Hughes and Gareth Kedward. With a completely new squad, the team finished fifth from bottom in Division 2, and because of the league restructure, demotion to Division 3 followed. Another relegation followed at the end of the 2010–11 season, and Hughes resigned mid-season.

Gwent County League (2011-present) 

Manager Mark Parfitt and assistant Jamie Jenkins built a new squad for 2011–12 using local players and managed a creditable third place in Division 1 of the Gwent County League. Season 2012–13 started in promising fashion but a few games into the season Parfitt stepped down and Jamie Jenkins took the hot seat, finishing the long hard season near the bottom.

The following season Jenkins was joined by his brother and ex-Crow Daniel Jenkins and the pair oversaw a good run of results: the team were fighting for the league championship until four defeats in the last five games resulted in a seventh-place finish.

The Crows appointed former Cwmbran Celtic FC manager Steve Morgan for the start of the 2014–15 season, but after a bad run of results with no wins in the first eight games, Morgan resigned. First team coach Andrew Howells stepped into the manager position and was joined by former PILCS manager Matthew Ryder with a third of the season remaining. Together they steered the team to the safety of 14th place. Howells left the club, and Ryder took over as manager for the 2015–16 season.

Season 2015–16 started so well on the new 3G pitch at Cwmbran Stadium winning more than usual; as the season ended, the Crows avoided another relegation, finishing in 12th place, with the league restructuring relegating 4 teams from the Gwent County League.

For 2016–17, Ryder brought in Gareth Hinwood as his assistant manager and a host of new players from Cwmbran Celtic FC, finishing the season in eight position, despite being the league's leading goal scorers; it was the other end that let the team down.
 
In 2017–18 Ryder and Hinwood had added quality to the squad, with a real hope of achieving promotion to the Welsh Football League. Ryder hit a bad patch over the Christmas period losing three games in succession resulted in him resigning, leaving the Crows in sixth position and Hinwood taking over as caretaker manager for the final ten games, but Hinwood also stepped down with three games remaining.

In April 2018, at the end of the season, Nicky Church was appointed manager with Della Cheedy as his assistant. The club finished the season in 4th place.

The 2018–19 season proved to be the Crows' strongest of recent years. The squad was enhanced with experience and talented youth players and although the Crows cemented 4th place again in the league, the club won the Gwent Senior Cup for the fourth time, beating a very strong Ynysddu Welfare side in the final 1-0 and claiming their first trophy in over 13 years.

On top of this, the Club endured a very strong showing in the Welsh Cup getting to the 2nd round proper eliminating Afan Lido of the Welsh League First Division before eventually being knocked out by Ton Pentre, losing 2–1 at Cwmbran Stadium.

An unbeaten league run of 17 games topped off a very successful season for Cwmbran Town.

The 2019–2020 season was cut short due to the coronavirus pandemic bringing a premature end to Nicky Church's reign as manager. Town secured a mid table finish due to a points per game outcome. Dean Taylor was appointed as Church's replacement in May but only lasted a few weeks in the job leaving for Abergavenny Town.

Lee Waddon replaced Dean Taylor in June with Wayne Jepson stepping in as assistant manager.

Honours

Senior 

League of Wales (Welsh Premier League) Inaugural Winners: 1992–93
Welsh Cup Runners-up: 1997, 2000, 2003
Welsh Premier League Cup Runners-up: 2001
Welsh Football League Division Two Champions: 1967–68
Welsh Football League Cup Winners: 1990–91
Gwent Senior Cup Winners: 1994–95, 1995–96, 2005–06, 2018–19
Monmouthshire Challenge Cup Winners: 1954–55, 1955–56

Youth 

League of Wales (Welsh Premier League Under 21) inaugural Winners: 2005–06
National MacWhirter Under-19s League Champions: 2002–03, 2004–05 
National MacWhirter Under-19s League Runners-up: 2003–04 
MacWhirter 7-a-side Champions: 2001/02  
Welsh League Under-19s East Division Champions: 2006–07 
Welsh League Under-19s East Division Runners-up: 2005–06 
Gwent County Under-14s Cup Champions: 2018–19
Gwent County Under-18s League Champions: 2003–04, 2004–05, 2005–06
Gwent County Under-18s League Runners-up: 2006–07
Gwent County Under-18s Youth Cup Winners: 2006–07 
Astoria Cup Winners: 2002–03
Torfaen League Under-16s League Runners up: 2015–16
Torfaen League Under-14s League Winners: 2018–19
Torfaen League Under-14s League Runners up: 2013–14
Torfaen League Under-14s Cup Champions: 2018–19
Torfaen League Under-12s League Champions: 2010–11, 2016–17
Torfaen League Under-12s Cup Champions: 2010–11, 2016–17
Torfaen League Under-12s Cup Runners up: 2011–12

League Record

European Record

Stadium

Cwmbran Stadium holds 10,500 people and the main outdoor arena consists of an international standard athletics track and field surrounding an artificial 3G football pitch.  The complex has an outdoor floodlit artificial playing surface for football and hockey.

Squad

Notable former players 

  Darren Campbell
  Mark Aizlewood
  Danny Gabbidon
  Richard Hurlin
  Kenny Morgans (former player-manager)
  Kaid Mohamed
  Glyn Garner
  Jason Perry

Coaching Staff

Club Officials

Youth Set Up 

The club has a large and very successful youth structure at various age groups. All youth sides are based at Pen-y-Lan playing fields in Cwmbran, Torfaen. The Club holds a very popular mini festival tournament each year which is attended by many clubs around the Gwent area.

Managerial History

Miscellaneous

Club Record Appearances

Top Scorers

References

External links

"Crows in cash crisis again"
"Takeover group could save Crows"

Football clubs in Wales
Association football clubs established in 1951
Cwmbran
Sport in Monmouthshire
1951 establishments in Wales
Gwent County League clubs
Welsh Football League clubs